Zuo Xiaoqing (born 25 June 1977) is a Chinese actress, TV presenter and former rhythmic gymnast.

She represented China at the 1992 World Rhythmic Gymnastics Championships. In 1993, Zuo played a minor role in Jiang Wen's directorial debut In the Heat of the Sun, which launched her acting career. Zuo has starred in several popular TV series over the years.

Athletic career

Zuo was born and raised in Changsha, Hunan. At the age of 8, she joined the Hunan's national rhythmic gymnastics team and retired in 1993.

Between 1991 and 1993, Zuo and her Hunan teammates won numerous national tournaments:

Acting career
Zuo made her film debut in Jiang Wen's In the Heat of the Sun (1994), playing Zhang Xiaomei. Zuo then entered Beijing Film Academy in 1995, majoring in acting, where she graduated in 1999. After graduation, Zuo worked as a hostess in Hunan Television.

From 2001 to 2009, Zuo starred in many television series, such as Qianlong Dynasty, The Great Revival and Love of The Millennium.

In 2007, Zuo played the role of Ai Xue in Approximately in the Winter, which earned her a Best Actress: Idol Award at the 4th Huading Awards.

Zuo played a good wife in the comedy film Lost on Journey (2010). That same year, she was nominated for Best TV Actress: City Award at the 6th Huading Awards for her performance in Simple Dish.

Personal life
Zuo married businessman Gao Quanjian, who was more than twenty years her senior, in September 2010, and their daughter was born in July 2011. On February 1, 2021, she announced her divorce on her personal Sina Weibo account.

Filmography

Film

Television

Awards

References

External links

1977 births
Actresses from Changsha
Living people
Beijing Film Academy alumni
Chinese rhythmic gymnasts
Sportspeople from Changsha
Chinese film actresses
Chinese television actresses
20th-century Chinese actresses
21st-century Chinese actresses
Gymnasts from Hunan